Thomas Alvin Stith (January 21, 1939 – June 13, 2010), born in Greenville County, Virginia, was an American professional basketball player, formerly of the NBA's New York Knicks. A 6' 5" forward, Stith was an All-American at St. Bonaventure University in 1960 and 1961.

College career
Stith attended St. Francis Preparatory School in Brooklyn and committed to St. Bonaventure University, where he and older brother Sam formed a formidable 1-2 punch. The Stith brothers posted a 52.0 points per game combined scoring average for the 1959-1960 season.  Tom Stith became St. Bonaventure's first consensus All-American in 1960 and 1961.  Stith left St. Bonaventure as the school's all-time leading scorer, ending his career with 2,052 points.  Stith finished second in the nation in scoring to Oscar Robertson in 1960, averaging 31.5 points per game, and he then finished third in 1961 with 29.6 points per game.

Professional career
After completing his collegiate eligibility, Stith was selected by the New York Knicks as the second pick overall in the 1961 NBA Draft, behind Indiana's Walt Bellamy.  He made the team and played in 46 games over the 1961–62 seasons.  However, Stith contracted tuberculosis only a month into the season, and his NBA career was cut short at 25 games and 3.2 points per game.

Death
Stith died on June 13, 2010, at the age of 71.

References

External links
NBA stats
Greater Buffalo Sports Hall of Fame profile

1939 births
2010 deaths
African-American basketball players
All-American college men's basketball players
Allentown Jets players
American men's basketball players
Basketball players from Virginia
New York Knicks draft picks
New York Knicks players
Parade High School All-Americans (boys' basketball)
People from Augusta County, Virginia
Small forwards
St. Bonaventure Bonnies men's basketball players
20th-century African-American sportspeople
21st-century African-American people